Lake Victor is an unincorporated community in Burnet County, Texas, United States. According to the Handbook of Texas, the community had an estimated population of 215 in 2000.

History
The Houston and Texas Central Railway laid a track through the community and it became a railroad stop in 1901 or 1902. It was named for nearby Lake Victor, which was formed by dirt being removed for the railroad; consequently, it was named for railroad foreman Victor Kellogg. In 1903, the land was surveyed, and lots were up for sale for settlers. A post office was established at Lake Victor that same year and remained in operation until 1957 when the community received mail service from Lampasas. Frank A. Ramsey served as the first postmaster. It became a successful farming and ranching community for the next 25+ years. There were three churches and several businesses that served 200 residents in 1914 and gained 50 residents in 1925. Growth was halted by the Great Depression and World War II. Its population remained stable throughout the 1960s, but several businesses closed. The Texas and New Orleans Railroad closed their track from Burnet to Lampasas in 1951. Its population grew to 350 in 1966, dropped to 300 in 1968, returned to 200 in 1972, and ended at 215 from the 1980s through 2000.

Lake Victor also has a Masonic lodge, established in December 1909.

Geography

Climate
The climate in this area is characterized by hot, humid summers and generally mild to cool winters. According to the Köppen Climate Classification system, Lake Victor has a humid subtropical climate, abbreviated "Cfa" on climate maps.

Education
Lake Victor had its own school in 1903. It became a part of the Burnet Consolidated Independent School District in 1947.

References

Unincorporated communities in Burnet County, Texas
Unincorporated communities in Texas